Paracheilinus is a genus of flasher wrasses, native to the Indian Ocean and the western Pacific Ocean.

Species
There are currently 20 recognized species in this genus:
 Paracheilinus alfiani G. R. Allen, Erdmann & Yusmalinda, 2016 
 Paracheilinus angulatus J. E. Randall & Lubbock, 1981 (Angular flasherwrasse)
 Paracheilinus attenuatus J. E. Randall, 1999
 Paracheilinus bellae J. E. Randall, 1988 (Bell's flasherwrasse)
 Paracheilinus carpenteri J. E. Randall & Lubbock, 1981 (Pink flasherwrasse)
 Paracheilinus cyaneus Kuiter & G. R. Allen, 1999 (Blue flasherwrasse)
 Paracheilinus filamentosus G. R. Allen, 1974 (Filamentous flasherwrasse)
 Paracheilinus flavianalis Kuiter & G. R. Allen, 1999 (Yellow-fin flasherwrasse)
 Paracheilinus hemitaeniatus J. E. Randall & Harmelin-Vivien, 1977
 Paracheilinus lineopunctatus J. E. Randall & Lubbock, 1981 (Spot-lined flasherwrasse)
 Paracheilinus mccoskeri J. E. Randall & Harmelin-Vivien, 1977 (McCosker's flasherwrasse)
 Paracheilinus nursalim G. R. Allen & Erdmann, 2008 (Nursalim flasherwrasse) 
 Paracheilinus octotaenia Fourmanoir, 1955 (Red Sea flasherwrasse)
 Paracheilinus paineorum G. R. Allen, Erdmann & Yusmalinda, 2016 
 Paracheilinus piscilineatus (Cornic, 1987)
 Paracheilinus rennyae G. R. Allen, Erdmann & Yusmalinda, 2013 
 Paracheilinus rubricaudalis J. E. Randall & G. R. Allen, 2003 (Red-tail flasherwrasse)
 Paracheilinus togeanensis Kuiter & G. R. Allen, 1999 (Togean flasherwrasse)
 Paracheilinus walton G. R. Allen & Erdmann, 2006 (Walton's flasherwrasse)
 Paracheilinus xanthocirritus G. R. Allen, Erdmann & Yusmalinda, 2016

References

 
Labridae
Marine fish genera
Taxa named by Pierre Fourmanoir